Paullelujah! is the first studio album by American hip hop musician MC Paul Barman. It was released on Coup d'État in 2002.

Critical reception
John Bush of AllMusic gave the album 2.5 stars out of 5, saying, "As a rapper, MC Paul Barman makes a pretty good humorist, though he's actually more clever than he is funny." Nathan Rabin of The A.V. Club said, "A steady diet of nothing but MC Paul Barman would be tough to take, but it'll be a sad day when there's no place in hip-hop for his kind of goofy iconoclast."

Will Hermes of Entertainment Weekly gave the album a grade of B−, describing MC Paul Barman as "a class clown courting a beat-down, a slappable slapsticker matching weakling production and little-league flow with gym-toned wit and ghetto chutzpah." Steve Juon of RapReviews.com said, "it's great for anyone who gets his concept, but his 'whiter than whitebread' rap flow will still irritate the hell out of everyone else.

Track listing

References

External links
 

2002 debut albums
MC Paul Barman albums
Albums produced by MF Doom
Albums produced by Prince Paul (producer)